The Melbourne and Hobson's Bay Railway Company was a railway company in Victoria, Australia. The company was incorporated on 20 January 1853 to build the line from Melbourne to the port of Sandridge, now Port Melbourne. 

The proposal met considerable opposition, despite the inadequacy and high costs of using horse drays and bullock wagons to carry merchandise from the port to the city. However, the combination of chaotic transport conditions and the extravagant financial prosperity that followed the gold rush led the community to realise the urgent need for railway communication on various routes, of which this one was prominent. The colony's pastoral somnolence was interrupted, never to recur, and a "railway boom" set in.

The line was constructed to  "broad gauge" in keeping with an agreement between the three then extant colonies to adopt that gauge – subsequently abandoned by the government of New South Wales.

The first engineer for the line was William Snell Chauncy, but he was forced to resign in 1845 due to problems with his work, such as the failure of piles on the railway pier.  James Moore C. E., a nephew of Sir William Cubitt (under whom he was engaged on the South Eastern and Great Northern railways in Britain and presumable learnt his trade there) was then appointed in March 1854 as Chief Engineer for the Hobson's Bay Railway company. It was said of Moore that he was a man of whose abilities rumour speaks favourably and was responsible for designing the railway line between the city and the pier main deep-water pier on Hobson's Bay at Sandridge.

Work began on laying the railway in March 1853. Trains were ordered from Robert Stephenson and Company of the United Kingdom, but the first train was hauled by a 2-2-2WT locomotive built by local engineering works Robertson, Martin & Smith, because of shipping delays. Australia's first steam locomotive was built in ten weeks and cost £2,700.

Opening 

The opening of the line occurred during the period of the Victorian gold rush – a time when both Melbourne and Victoria undertook massive capital works, each with its own gala opening. The inaugural journey on the Sandridge line was no exception. According to the Argus newspaper's report of the next day: "Long before the hour appointed ... a great crowd assembled round the station at the Melbourne terminus, lining the whole of Flinders Street". Lieutenant-Governor Sir Charles Hotham and Lady Hotham were aboard the train – which consisted of two first class carriages and one second class – and were presented with satin copies of the railway's timetable and bylaws.

The trip took 10 minutes, none of the later stations along the line having been built.

Subsequent history 
By March 1855, the four engines ordered from the UK were all in service, with trains running every half-hour. They were named Melbourne, Sandridge, Victoria, and Yarra (after the Yarra River over which the line crossed).

Despite high construction costs, the railway was an immediate success, carrying 270,000 passengers and 28,135 tons of goods in its first full year of operations.

In 1857, the Company opened a  line from the present-day Flinders Street station to St Kilda to meet up with the St Kilda to Brighton line being built by the St Kilda and Brighton Railway Company. The name of William Elsdon, the Engineer in Chief, who designed the line, is engraved into the parapet of the bridge at Park Street.

Melbourne and Hobson's Bay Railway Company absorbed the two other remaining suburban railway companies in 1865: the St Kilda and Brighton Railway Company and the Melbourne and Suburban Railway Company. The combined company was incorporated as the Melbourne and Hobson's Bay United Railway Company. In turn it was sold, for £1,320,820, to the Government of Victoria in 1878 to become part of Victorian Railways. Both lines became part of the Melbourne suburban electrified network during the 20th century.

During the company's 13 years' existence, the average annual dividend of 7 per cent on working operations had resulted, equal to a return of nearly £49 on each £50 share.

Most parts of the two lines were converted to standard gauge light rail in 1987 as tram routes 96 and 109.

Rolling stock

Locomotives - Melbourne and Hobson's Bay Railway

Locomotives - Melbourne & Hobson's Bay United Railway

References

External links
 Trove List:-Melbourne and Hobson's Bay Railway Company
 Trove List:-Melbourne and Hobson's Bay United Railway Company

Defunct railway companies of Australia
History of Melbourne
Railway companies established in 1853
Railway companies disestablished in 1878